The following is a list of the MTV Europe Music Award winners and nominees for Best New Zealand Act.

Winners and nominees
Winners are listed first and highlighted in bold.

2010s

2020s

See also 
 Viewers Choice New Zealand at MTV Australia Awards

References

New Zealander Act
Awards established in 2013
New Zealand music awards